Stephen Palfrey Webb (March 20, 1804 – September 29, 1879) was an American politician who served as the third and twelfth mayor of Salem, Massachusetts, and the 5th mayor of San Francisco, California.

Early life, family life, education, and death
Stephen Palfrey Webb was born to Captain Stephen Webb and Sara Putnam Palfrey Webb in Salem, Massachusetts on March 20, 1804. Webb graduated from Harvard College in 1824 and studied law with John Glen King.

Career 
Webb was admitted to the Essex County Bar in 1826 and began his practice of law in Salem.

Webb served in the Massachusetts House of Representatives and the Massachusetts Senate. He was elected mayor of Salem, Massachusetts in 1842, 1843, and 1844. Webb was also Treasurer and Clerk of the Essex Railroad in 1849.

Webb moved to San Francisco in approximately 1853 and was elected mayor for a single term with backing from the Know Nothing movement in 1854. He prepared a report about the vigilance committees in 1874 entitled A Sketch of the Causes, Operations and Results of the San Francisco Vigilance Committee in 1856.

Webb returned to Salem and was again elected mayor in 1860, 1861, and 1862, and served as City Clerk from 1863 to 1870. He then retired to Brookline, Massachusetts.

Personal life 
On May 26, 1834, Webb married Hannah Hunt Beckford Robinson. They had one daughter, Caroline B. Webb, in about 1846. Webb died in Brookline, Massachusetts on September 29, 1879.

References

External links
 Mayor's of Salem from the City of Salem, Massachusetts.
 List of mayors of Salem, MA from the Political Graveyard
 San Francisco's Alcades and Mayors
 

1804 births
1879 deaths
Mayors of Salem, Massachusetts
Mayors of San Francisco
Republican Party members of the Massachusetts House of Representatives
Republican Party Massachusetts state senators
Harvard College alumni
19th-century American politicians